Packman & Poppe (P&P) was a British motorcycle manufacturer. Founded by Erling Poppe and Gilmour Packman the first motorcycle was produced in 1922 with a  two-stroke engine. This was followed by a  side-valve machine with a JAP V-twin engine in 1923 and the Silent Three using a  Barr and Stroud sleeve-valve engine. Packman & Poppe entered three machines in the 1925 Isle of Man TT. Packman was injured in an argument with a salesman and died. In the same year the Packman & Poppe factory was destroyed by a fire and in 1926 sold to John Wooler, who kept up production until the Depression, in 1930.

References

External links
 Rare photo of P&P 976cc V twin 1923

Defunct motor vehicle manufacturers of the United Kingdom
1922 establishments in England
1930 disestablishments in England
Vehicle manufacturing companies established in 1922
Vehicle manufacturing companies disestablished in 1930
British companies disestablished in 1930
British companies established in 1922